Martin Ekani (born 21 April 1984 in Aubervilliers, France) is a French footballer who played four matches in Ligue 1 for RC Lens in the 2003–2004 season and 13 matches in Ligue 2 for Angers SCO in the 2004-2005 season.

References

1984 births
Living people
French footballers
RC Lens players
Angers SCO players
Association football defenders